Shoebox is the eighth studio album by the South Korean hip hop group Epik High. It was released digitally on October 21, 2014, and physically on October 22, through YG Entertainment. "Spoiler" and "Happen Ending" served as the title tracks for the album.

Background

YG Entertainment announced on October 13, 2014, that the group would make a comeback with their eighth studio album on October 21. It was also revealed that the album release was delayed one week due to the music video shoot taking longer than expected. The Japanese edition of this album was released by YGEX, the joint label between YG Entertainment and Japanese record label Avex Trax, on December 24, 2014.

Track listing

Notes
 "Spoiler" contains uncredited vocals from Gong Hyo-jin.
 "Amor Fati" contains uncredited vocals from Taeyang.
 "Lesson 5 (Timeline)" contains uncredited vocals from Dok2.
 "Eyes, Nose, Lips" (featuring Taeyang) was originally a part of Taeyang's Eyes, Nose, Lips Cover Project.
 Most of the tracks on the Japanese edition of the album have cleaner lyrics and were edited to sound less aggressive and more suitable for younger audiences.

Chart performance

Albums chart

Release history

Notes

References

2014 albums
Epik High albums